Spathicarpa is a genus of flowering plants in the family Araceae, all of which are endemic to South America. Spathicarpa species are notable for the fact that the entirety of their spadix is fused to the spathe. The genus is believed to be closely related to Spathantheum. The tribe Spathicarpeae is named after the genus Spathicarpa.

Species
 Spathicarpa gardneri Schott - Brazil
 Spathicarpa hastifolia Hook. - Brazil, Bolivia, Paraguay, Uruguay, northeastern Argentina
 Spathicarpa lanceolata Engl. - Paraguay, southern Brazil

References

 
Araceae genera
Flora of South America